Eero Ari Herbert Westergård (14 May 1948 – 15 October 2010) was a Finnish sports shooter. He competed at the 1972, 1976 and the 1980 Summer Olympics.

References

1948 births
2010 deaths
Finnish male sport shooters
Olympic shooters of Finland
Shooters at the 1972 Summer Olympics
Shooters at the 1976 Summer Olympics
Shooters at the 1980 Summer Olympics
Sportspeople from Pori